Kunturiri may refer to:

Mountains
 Kunturiri (Bolivia and Chile), on the border of Bolivia and Chile
 Kunturiri (Chuquisaca), in the Chuquisaca Department, Bolivia
 Kunturiri (Frías), in the Tomás Frías Province, Potosí Department, Bolivia
 Kunturiri (La Paz), in the La Paz Municipality, Murillo Province, La Paz Department, Bolivia
 Kunturiri (Linares), in the José María Linare Province, Potosí Department, Bolivia
 Kunturiri (Loayza), in the Malla Municipality, Loayza Province, La Paz Department, Bolivia
 Kunturiri (Los Andes), in the Pukarani Municipality, Los Andes Province, La Paz Department, Bolivia
 Kunturiri (Pacajes), in the Pacajes Province, La Paz Department, Bolivia
 Kunturiri (Palca), in the Palca Municipality, Murillo Province, La Paz Department, Bolivia
 Kunturiri (Peru), a mountain in the Puno Region, Peru
 Kunturiri (Sajama), in the Turku Municipality, Sajama Province, Oruro Department, Bolivia

Places 
 Conduriri District in the Puno Region, Peru, and its seat Cunduriri

See also 
 Kunturi (disambiguation)
 Jach'a Kunturiri (Oruro), a mountain in the Curahuara de Carangas  Municipality, Sajama Province, Oruro Department, Bolivia
 Jach'a Kunturiri (La Paz), a mountain at the border of Charaña Municipality and Qalaqutu Municipality, Pacajes Province, La Paz Department, Bolivia
 Jisk'a Kunturiri, a mountain in the Oruro Department, Bolivia